Germany at the World Athletics Indoor Championships after the Fall of the Berlin Wall, from 1991 edition participated at all editions of the World Athletics Indoor Championships.

Medal count

See also
 German Athletics Association
 Germany at the World Athletics Championships
 Germany at the European Athletics Championships
 Germany at the European Athletics Team Championships

References

External links
 

Athletics in Germany
Germany
World Indoor Championships